Eleonora Evi (born 20 November 1983) is an Italian politician. Since July 2021, Evi is the spokesperson of Green Europe, sharing the leadership of the party with Angelo Bonelli.

Biography
Born in Milan, Evi has been elected as a Member of the European Parliament in 2014, and was re-elected in 2019. She joined the Greens–European Free Alliance group in December 2020 together with her colleagues Rosa D'Amato, Ignazio Corrao and Piernicola Pedicini.

References

1983 births
Living people
MEPs for Italy 2014–2019
MEPs for Italy 2019–2024
21st-century women MEPs for Italy
Five Star Movement MEPs
Politicians from Milan
Green Europe politicians
Deputies of Legislature XIX of Italy
Women members of the Chamber of Deputies (Italy)
Polytechnic University of Milan alumni